The 1975 Australian Tourist Trophy was a motor race staged at the Calder circuit in Victoria, Australia on 25 May 1975. The race was open to Production Sports Cars and was recognized by the Confederation of Australian Motor Sport as an Australian national title race. It was the thirteenth Australian Tourist Trophy and the first to be awarded since 1968. The race, which was contested over two heats, was won by Peter Warren driving a Bolwell Nagari.

Summary
The race was contested over two, 25 lap, 40 km heats. Points were awarded on a 15-14-13-12-10-9-8-7-6-5-4-3-2-1 basis to the first fifteen finishers in each heat.

The first heat was won by Peter Warren and the second by Steve Webb, both driving Bolwell Nagaris. Warren and Paul Trevathan (MGB) finished equal on points after the two heats with Warren initially declared the winner and presented with the trophy. The decision was then revised with Trevethan determined to be the winner, having finished higher in the second heat. Warren lodged a successful protest based on his faster combined heat times, as per the race regulations.

Results

Race statistics
 Number of entries: 32 
 Number of cars which practiced: 28 
 Pole Position: Rex Colliver (Lotus 47), 48.8s 
 Fastest lap (Heat 1): Peter Woodward (Lotus 47) 
 Fastest lap (Heat 2): Peter Woodward (Lotus 47), 55.0

References

External links
 Peter Warren Bolwell Nagari Calder 1975 (image), www.oldracephotos.com, as archived at web.archive.org

Australian Tourist Trophy
Tourist Trophy
Motorsport in Victoria (Australia)